Mantura matthewsii is a species of Chrysomelidae family, that is common in Slovakia, Turkey.

References

Beetles described in 1833
Alticini